Dacryodes rugosa var. virgata is a tree in the family Burseraceae.

Distribution
Dacryodes rugosa var. virgata grows widely in Malaysian Borneo's Sarawak and Sabah states. It is also found in Indonesia's Kalimantan region on Borneo.

References

rugosa var. virgata
Trees of Borneo
Plants described in 1932